The Joint Intelligence Operations Center Europe (JIOCEUR) Analytic Center (JAC), formerly known as the Joint Analysis Center, is a Joint Intelligence Center serving as a military intelligence analysis centre for the United States European Command located at RAF Molesworth, Cambridgeshire, United Kingdom and managed by the Defense Intelligence Agency. The area of responsibility includes over 50 countries in Europe, 33 Sub-Saharan and West African countries, and the Middle East.

It was moved to Molesworth in 1992 with all Tactical Intelligence assets coming from ODCSINT USAREUR/7A and all Administration and Strategic Intelligence assets coming from Stuttgart. Staff Sergeant (SSG) Joyé LaBarge Gecowetts was the first "Plank Owner" at the JAC as she moved all Tactical Intelligence assets from ODCSINT USAREUR/7A at Campbell Barracks, Heidelberg, Germany, as their Noncommissioned Officer In Charge (NCOIC) of the Ground Order of Battle Division (GOBD). SSG "Jake" Gecowetts, a Senior Tactical and Strategic Intelligence Analyst, was also the first US Army Soldier assigned to England from USAREUR/7A since World War II.

In January 2015, the DoD announced that Molesworth and RAF Alconbury were to close. In accordance with the European Infrastructure Consolidation announced by the Department of Defense in early 2015, "..[t]he majority of U.S. personnel, and many of the U.S.-funded host Nation positions assigned to these bases will be transferred to RAF Croughton." This was to take place 'over the next several years'.

The U.S. European Command posture statement for 2015 said:
"Another key EUCOM MILCON [Military Construction] priority project is the consolidation of the JIOCEUR Analytic Center and other intelligence elements at RAF Croughton, UK. The Department requested planning and design funding for the consolidation during FY 2015, with three phases of MILCON construction in FY 2015-2017 respectively. We anticipate the construction completion will occur in FY 2019, with movement of units occurring in FY 2019/2020.

Phase 1 includes EUCOM’s Joint Analysis Center (JAC) as well as Defense Intelligence Agency’s Regional Support Center. The planned replacement facility will consolidate intelligence operations into an efficient, purpose-built building which will save the U.S. Government $74 million per year and reduce significant operational risk associated with current substandard, deteriorating facilities. The RAF Croughton site also ensures continuation of the strong EUCOM-UK intelligence relationships our sponsorship of the co-located NATO Intelligence Fusion Center.

The maintenance of our intelligence relationships with the UK and NATO remains vital to EUCOM’s capability to conduct military operations from and within Europe. Phase 2, programmed for FY 2016, adds AFRICOM intelligence activities (currently at RAF Molesworth), the NATO Intelligence Fusion Center, and the Battlefield Information Collection and Exploitation System (BICES), which provides classified communications to our NATO partners."

External links

 Joint Analysis Center a profile on JAC by Federation of American Scientists

 

United States intelligence agencies
Defense Intelligence Agency